Tenvik is a village and statistical area (grunnkrets) in Nøtterøy municipality, Norway.

The statistical area Tenvik, which also can include the peripheral parts of the village as well as the surrounding countryside, has a population of 207.

References

Villages in Vestfold og Telemark